Selvam is a 1966 Indian Tamil-language comedy drama film written and directed by K. S. Gopalakrishnan from a story by B. S. Ramiah, and produced by V. K. Ramasamy. The film stars Sivaji Ganesan and K. R. Vijaya. It was released on 11 November 1966.

Plot

Cast 
Sivaji Ganesan as Selvam
K. R. Vijaya as Valli
S. V. Ranga Rao as Dr. Rajan
S. V. Sahasranamam as Boothalingam
V. Nagayya as Kanthasamy
M. V. Rajamma as Dhanalakshmi
M. S. Sundari Bai as Mangalam
Nagesh as Iyer Kathakalachebam
Rama Prabha as Rathna
A. K. Veerasami

Production 
Selvam was directed by K. S. Gopalakrishnan, who wrote the screenplay from a story by B. S. Ramiah. The film was produced by actor V. K. Ramasamy, who did not feature. It was lighter than the melodramatic films Sivaji Ganesan was previously known for starring in. The film ridicules horoscopes, astrology and superstition.

Soundtrack 
The music was composed by K. V. Mahadevan.

Release and reception 
Selvam was released on 11 November 1966. Kalki criticised Gopalakrishnan's screenplay for lacking essence and direction for lacking newness, but said the dialogues had richness.

References

External links 
 

1960s Tamil-language films
1966 comedy-drama films
1966 films
Films about superstition
Films directed by K. S. Gopalakrishnan
Films scored by K. V. Mahadevan
Films with screenplays by K. S. Gopalakrishnan
Indian comedy-drama films